Miguel Start (born 30 November 1987) is a former Samoa international rugby league footballer who played as a .

Background
Start was born in Auckland, New Zealand.

Playing career
Start was educated at Mount Albert Grammar School, and played for the Pakuranga Jaguars in the Auckland Rugby League competition.

In 2005 Start represented the Junior Kiwis in 2005. He played for both the New Zealand Residents and Samoa in 2006.

Start was signed with the New Zealand Warriors in the National Rugby League competition for 2007. Start did not make his NRL debut but did appear in the NSWRL Premier League for the Auckland Lions.

References

1987 births
Living people
Auckland rugby league team players
Junior Kiwis players
New Zealand sportspeople of Samoan descent
New Zealand rugby league players
Pakuranga Jaguars players
Rugby league centres
Rugby league players from Auckland
Samoa national rugby league team players